Horace Anthony Chang (born 10 November 1952) is a Jamaican doctor and politician who is both the current Deputy Prime Minister of Jamaica and the Minister of National Security.  He was formerly the Minister of Water, Environment and Housing from September 2007 to December 2011.

Early life
Chang was born on 10 November 1952 in New Roads, Westmoreland, Jamaica. He attended the New Roads All-age School, Cornwall College, and the University of the West Indies. In university, Chang was the president of the Guild of Undergraduates and led the University Games Committee, during which time he solved the organisation's financial problems and re-established a relationship with their Cuban counterparts.

Career
Trained a medical doctor, Chang entered politics in 1976 as a member of the Jamaica Labour Party (JLP). He was a youth leader in East Rural St. Andrew and the vice-president of Young Jamaica. In 1980, at age 27, he was elected into parliament as a representative of Hanover Western, serving till 1989. From 1980 to 1986, Chang worked in the Ministry of Health as Parliamentary Secretary. In 2002, he was elected as Member of Parliament for Saint James North Western. From 2007 to 2011, Chang served as Minister of Housing, Environment, Water and Local Government. At this direction, the National Housing Development Corporation of Jamaica became the Housing Agency of Jamaica. During his tenure as minister, Chang also spearheaded the US$211 million Jamaica Water Supply Improvement Project (JWSDIP), the largest project of its kind then. Chang has served as the Minister of National Security since March 2018 and as Deputy Prime Minister since September 2020.

Personal life
Chang and his wife Paulette have two children. He is an avid reader and domino player.

Recognition
In January 2020, the Quebec Avenue roadway in Montego Bay was renamed to Dr Horace Chang Boulevard. At the renaming ceremony, Mayor Homer Davis praised Chang as "a man for all seasons, a man who is a true and humble servant of not just the people of St James, but Jamaica, the Caribbean and the world".

References

Living people
1952 births
Members of the House of Representatives of Jamaica
Government ministers of Jamaica
Jamaica Labour Party politicians
Jamaican people of Chinese descent
Cornwall College, Jamaica alumni
Members of the 14th Parliament of Jamaica